Redmond is a city in King County, Washington, United States, located  east of Seattle. The population was 73,256 at the 2020 census, up from 54,144 in 2010.

Redmond is best known as the home of Microsoft and Nintendo of America.

With an annual bike race on city streets and the state's only velodrome, Redmond is also known as the "Bicycle Capital of the Northwest".

History
Native Americans have lived in the Redmond area for about 10,000 years, based on artifacts discovered at the Redmond Town Center archaeological site and Marymoor Prehistoric Indian Site. The first European settlers arrived in the 1870s. Luke McRedmond filed a Homestead Act claim for land next to the Sammamish Slough on September 9, 1870, and the following year Warren Perrigo took up land adjacent to him. The rivers and streams had so many salmon that the settlement was initially named Salmonberg. More settlers came, and with the establishment of the first post office in 1881, the name of the community was changed to Melrose. The new name was derived from the Perrigos' successful inn, Melrose House, which upset McRedmond. After becoming postmaster, he successfully petitioned to have the name changed to Redmond in 1883.

The abundant forests and fish of Redmond provided jobs for loggers and fishermen, and with those jobs came demand for goods and services, bringing in merchants. The logging industry expanded significantly in 1889 when the Seattle, Lake Shore and Eastern Railway built a station in the center of town. The first plat for Redmond was filed on May 11, 1891, encompassing much of the area now known as downtown. After reaching the necessary population of 300, Redmond was incorporated on December 31, 1912.

Redmond experienced an economic downturn in the 1920s. Prohibition forced saloons to close, cutting off a large portion of the city's tax base. The forests were declining after heavy logging, causing lumber mills to shut down. The deforested land was suitable for farming. Agriculture became Redmond's primary business, keeping residents fed during the Great Depression. When the U.S. entered World War II, shipyard jobs and other wartime work came to Redmond.

After the war, Redmond's expansion began in earnest. The city expanded over thirty times larger in area through annexations between 1951 and 1967. From 1956 to 1965, Redmond was bordered by the town of East Redmond, which was formed by rural homeowners and later dissolved by the Washington Supreme Court. The completion of the Evergreen Point Floating Bridge across Lake Washington in 1963 allowed Redmond to flourish as a suburb of Seattle. In 1978, the U.S. Census Bureau proclaimed Redmond the fastest growing city in the state. Many technology companies made the city their home, and the increasing population demanded more retail shops. By the late 1980s, Downtown Redmond had become "a series of strip centers surrounded by parking lots", sparking plans for a mixed-use revitalized downtown.

Redmond underwent a commercial boom during the 1990s, culminating in 1997 with the opening of Redmond Town Center, a major regional shopping center on the site of a long-defunct golf course. In recent years the city has seen rising traffic congestion as a result of its rapid expansion, particularly in areas of urban sprawl. To address these issues, SR 520 is undergoing expansion and light rail service via the East Link Extension from Seattle to Redmond is set to open in 2024.

Geography
Redmond is bordered by Kirkland to the west, Bellevue to the southwest, and Sammamish to the southeast. Unincorporated King County lies to the north (with Woodinville a short distance beyond) and east. The city's urban downtown lies just north of Lake Sammamish; residential areas lie north and west of the lake. Overlake, the city's second urban center, is to the west of Lake Sammamish. The Sammamish River runs north from the lake along the west edge of the city's downtown.

Climate
Redmond, like most of the Pacific Northwest, has a mild climate for its latitude, but still gets all four seasons. Summers tend to be warm and dry, with low rainfall and sunny or partly sunny from June to September. Winters tend to be cool and wet, with November being the rainiest month. Snowfall is uncommon, with the most common cold air being in a form of a high pressure system, driving out the rains from the area. However, snowfall is not as rare as in other cities like Seattle near the moderating effects of Puget Sound. The average warmest month is August. On average, the coolest month is January. The maximum average precipitation occurs in December.

Redmond has an Oceanic climate (Cfb).

Demographics

2010 census
As of the census of 2010, there were 54,144 people, 22,550 households, and 13,890 families residing in the city. The racial makeup of the city was 65.2% White, 1.7% African American, 0.4% Native American, 25.4% Asian, 0.2% Pacific Islander, 3.2% from other races, and 4.0% from two or more races. Hispanic or Latino of any race were 7.8% of the population.

There were 22,550 households, of which 32.4% had children under the age of 18 living with them, 51.4% were married couples living together, 6.9% had a female householder with no husband present, 3.3% had a male householder with no wife present, and 38.4% were non-families. 29.6% of all households were made up of individuals, and 7% had someone living alone who was 65 years of age or older. The average household size was 2.39 and the average family size was 2.98.

The median age in the city was 34.1 years. 22.7% of residents were under the age of 18; 7.5% were between the ages of 18 and 24; 38.7% were from 25 to 44; 21.6% were from 45 to 64; and 9.5% were 65 years of age or older. The sex ratio of the city was 50.9% male and 49.1% female.

2000 census
As of the census of 2000, there were 45,256 people, 19,102 households, and 11,346 families residing in the city.  The population density was 2,848.8 people per square mile (1,099.7/km2).  There were 20,248 housing units at an average density of 1,274.6 per square mile (492.0/km2).  The racial makeup of the city was 79.3% White, 13.0% Asian, 1.5% African American, 0.5% Native American, 0.2% Pacific Islander, 2.5% from other races, and 3.1% from two or more races. Hispanic or Latino of any race were 5.6% of the population. 

There were 19,102 households, out of which 28.5% had children under the age of 18 living with them, 48.9% were married couples living together, 7.6% had a female householder with no husband present, and 40.6% were non-families. 30.4% of all households were made up of individuals, and 6.1% had someone living alone who was 65 years of age or older.  The average household size was 2.33 and the average family size was 2.95.

In the city, the population was spread out, with 21.5% under the age of 18, 9.5% from 18 to 24, 37.9% from 25 to 44, 21.9% from 45 to 64, and 9.3% who were 65 years of age or older.  The median age was 34 years. For every 100 females, there were 100.4 males.  For every 100 females age 18 and over, there were 99.5 males.

The median income for a household in the city was $66,735, and the median income for a family was $78,430. Males had a median income of $58,112 versus $37,200 for females. The per capita income for the city was $36,233.  About 3.3% of families and 5.3% of the population were below the poverty line, including 6.3% of those under age 18 and 6.5% of those age 65 or over.

Economy

Several companies in the high-tech industry are based in Redmond. The largest employer in the city by far is Microsoft, which moved its headquarters to Redmond in 1986. Microsoft has over 40,000 blue badge FTEs (full-time employee), 45,000 orange badge contractors (as of June 2012, there are over 94,000 workers, and over half are contractors), and more than 8 million square feet (750,000 square meters) of office space in the Seattle area Eastside region, primarily in Redmond, with additional offices in Bellevue and Issaquah (90,000 employees worldwide). In June 2006, Microsoft purchased former Safeco's Redmond campus at 4515–5069 154th Place NE for $220.5 million.

Other companies with headquarters in Redmond include Nintendo of America, Genie Industries (now part of Terex), Physio-Control (now part of Stryker), Visible.net, WildTangent, Solstice (acquired by Samsung) and Data I/O.

In 2015, SpaceX and Hyperloop Genesis announced opening of a facility in Redmond. Their focus will be R&D and manufacturing for a proposed internet communications satellite constellation and new transport systems.

Unlike Bellevue and other neighboring cities, the city of Redmond does not have a business and occupation tax on income. However, to help offset the costs of road improvements for businesses, a business license fee of $55 per employee was approved in 1996. , the fee is $107 per employee.

Top employers
According to Redmond's Comprehensive Annual Financial Reports, the top employers in the city are:

Culture
Redmond Derby Days is an annual community festival held the second full weekend of July and celebrated its 75th anniversary in 2015. It began as a race around Lake Sammamish called the Redmond Bicycle Derby in 1939, and since then has become a multi-day event including a bicycle criterium, parade, entertainment stages, beer garden, local food offerings and activities. It also includes a carnival with rides and attractions and a fireworks display at dusk on Saturday.

Performing arts in Redmond include the Eastside Symphony and the Second Story Repertory theater company, as well as artists who play at the Redmond Performing Arts Center. Redmond has a collection of outdoor sculptures throughout its streets and parks, many of which are part of a rotating sculpture exhibition.

Redmond Lights is an annual community festival held the first Saturday of December. It features a special guest each year, a tree-lighting conducted by the mayor on city hall campus, a luminary walk on the Sammamish Trail and Redmond Central Connector with musical and light stations along the way to Redmond Town Center where there are many special attractions such as a carousel, skating rink and food sampling.

The Old Redmond Firehouse is a center for local teens. It has become a hub in the thriving Eastside independent music scene. Local bands perform here with concert style speakers.

Since 2010, by city ordinance, Redmond has appointed a poet laureate. The inaugural laureate was Rebecca Meredith (2010–2012), followed by Jeannine Hall Gailey (2012–2013), Michael Dylan Welch (2013–2015), Shin Yu Pai (2015–2017),  Melanie Noel (2018–2019), Raul Sanchez (2019-2021), and Laura Da' (2022-2023).

The Concerts at Marymoor is an annual summer series of concerts held at the amphitheater in Marymoor Park.  The venue has been host to artists as diverse as Norah Jones, Peter, Paul & Mary, Rob Thomas and Duran Duran. When visiting the Seattle area, Cirque du Soleil has set up in Marymoor since the 2004 tour of Varekai when a concrete base was built for them to set up on. Since then, tours of Corteo (2006), Kooza (2010), Amaluna (2013), Kurios (2015) and Luzia (2017) have played in this spot. Marymoor also hosted the Warped Tour and Cavalia in 2012 and 2014.

Redmond Saturday Market is the oldest farmer's market in the Seattle area's east side. This market is held on Saturdays from May through October on approximately 8,000 square feet of land near the Redmond Town Center. The City of Redmond has approved an ordinance that the current market site be preserved for its community and historic significance.

Landmarks
Redmond has designated the following landmarks:

Parks and recreation

Many of these are neighborhood parks with picnic tables and sports fields or courts. The largest park within the city is not owned by the city – it is King County's  Marymoor Park, one of the most popular in King County. It features a climbing rock, a model airplane flying field, a 48-acre off-leash dog park, an outdoor theater, sports fields such as baseball and soccer, a playground, tennis courts, a community garden, cricket pitch, and a velodrome, which hosts the FSA Star Crossed – Redmond cyclo-cross competition in September.

The Sammamish River Trail connects to the Puget Power trail, the Burke-Gilman Trail (in Bothell), and the East Lake Sammamish Trail.

60 Acres Park is known for its soccer in the spring through fall and RC electric airplanes and gliders in the winter time.

In 2004, Redmond North Little League won the Northwest region and participated in the Little League World Series in South Williamsport, PA.  With Redmond North claiming the Northwest, it is the third team from Washington to claim the Northwest since its inception in 2001. Previous Washington champions were Bainbridge Island (2001), Richland (2003).

Government

Redmond has a non-partisan mayor–council form of government, with the mayor and seven council members elected at-large for staggered four-year terms. The city council authorized a ballot measure in March 2003 that would have changed Redmond to a council-manager government. However, it was rejected by the electorate, receiving less than 30% of the vote.

Education

Most of Redmond is part of the Lake Washington School District, which also encompasses almost all of Kirkland and parts of other surrounding communities. The public schools in Redmond include ten elementary schools, eight middle schools, and two high schools. The district also offers "choice" schools at all levels for alternative schooling needs. The city's two high schools are Redmond High School and Nikola Tesla STEM High School, a choice school.

Three private schools in Redmond offer secondary education: The Overlake School (secular), The Bear Creek School (Christian – primary and secondary), and the Conservatory High School (for performing arts students).

The English Hill neighborhood in North Redmond (unincorporated King County) is served by the Northshore School District and Sunrise Elementary. The far east side of Redmond is known as Redmond Ridge.  Redmond Ridge and Redmond Ridge East communities are part of the Lake Washington School District.  East of 248th to West Snoqualmie Valley Road is served by the Riverview School District. South of 24th Street is served by the Bellevue School District.

DigiPen Institute of Technology and a secondary campus owned by Lake Washington Technical College is currently being leased to the City of Redmond for a Community Center are located in Redmond.

The city is home to Redmond Regional Library, the second-largest branch in the King County Library System.

Notable people
 John Archer, actor
 Karan Brar, actor (Chirag Gupta in Diary of a Wimpy Kid, Rodrick Rules, Dog Days and Ravi Ross in Jessie)
 Carrie Brownstein, guitarist and vocalist for Sleater-Kinney
 Dudley C. Carter, artist and woodcarver
 Jeff Cirillo, former third baseman for several Major League Baseball teams
 Michael Conforto, Major League Baseball player for the New York Mets
 Daniel Dociu, concept artist and video game art director
 James Doohan, actor, famous for playing Scotty in the television series Star Trek
 Nick Downing, retired professional soccer player
 Sandra Eisert, art director, photographer
 Jeannine Hall Gailey, poet, writer, poet laureate of Redmond 2012–2013
 Johnny Hekker, punter for NFL's Los Angeles Rams
 Henry Hill, former mobster, lived in Redmond in the late 1980s
 Earl Johnson, winning pitcher in Game 1 of 1946 World Series, born in Redmond
 Lu Sheng-yen, founder of the True Buddha School
 Shannon O'Donnell, former NBC 11/Bay Area now KOMO 4 weather anchor, later for NBC's Early Today
 Nick Thune, actor, comedian
 Steve Wiebe, two-time Donkey Kong world record holder, featured in The King of Kong: A Fistful of Quarters

References

Further reading
 Malowney, Georgeann (2002). Redmond (Images of America: Washington). Chicago: Arcadia Publishing. .
 Way, Nancy (1989). Our Town Redmond. Redmond, Washington: Marymoor Museum. .

External links

 Official website

 
Cities in Washington (state)
Cities in　King County, Washington
Cities in the Seattle metropolitan area
Populated places established in 1870
1870 establishments in Washington Territory